Vimalagiri Public School is an educational institution in Kothamangalam, Kerala. It is affiliated to CBSE, Delhi.

The school was founded by Msgr Fr. John Varghese Easwarankudiyil in the 1980s

The school started operation in 1982 as a Kinder Garten. It is run and managed by Malankara Catholic Church Diocese of Muvattupuzha.

The school is located at college junction, Kothamangalam on the National Highway 85.The school has sister concerns in Thrissur and Vazhapilly, Muvattupuzha.

Motto 
The Fear of God is The Beginning of Wisdom

Christian schools in Kerala
Schools in Ernakulam district